The Liberty Political Action Conference (LPAC) was an annual political conference attended by conservative and libertarian activists and elected officials from across the United States. The conference was held from 2011 to 2014, in various locations.

LPAC was hosted by Campaign for Liberty, a 501(c)(4) nonprofit that is currently chaired by former Congressman Ron Paul of Texas.

History
The first Liberty Political Action Conference took place prior to the 2012 Republican primary season from September 15–17, 2011 in Reno, Nevada. Speakers at the conference included Ron Paul, Senators Rand Paul and Mike Lee, Congressman Steve Stockman, actors Vince Vaughn and Jerry Doyle, Chuck Baldwin, and Debra Medina, among others.

The second LPAC took place following the 2012 Republican primary season, from September 13–15, 2012, and prior to the 2012 presidential election in Chantilly, Virginia outside of Washington, D.C. Speakers at the conference included Ron Paul, Senators Rand Paul, Mike Lee, Jim DeMint and Ted Cruz, Congressman Justin Amash and Scott Garrett, actor Jerry Doyle, Mallory Factor, and Virginia Attorney General Ken Cuccinelli, among others.

The third LPAC conference took place in Chantilly, Virginia from September 19–22, 2013. The fourth LPAC conference took place in Alexandria, Virginia from September 18–20, 2014, but there was never a confirmation of an event held in 2015.

Locations

See also
 Campaign for Liberty

References

External links
 Liberty Political Action Conference, official website

Political conferences
Political conventions in the United States
Conservative organizations in the United States
Libertarian organizations based in the United States